The Serçe Limani Shipwreck or Glass Shipwreck is a shipwreck discovered in the Serçe Limani bay, southwest coast of Turkey, opposing Rhodos, in the Mediterranean Sea. The shipwreck was discovered by Donald Frey during an individual dive.

The ship
It was a merchant ship that sailed in c. 1025 AD, probably a Byzantino-Slavic one, with a crew of Hellenized Bulgarians, going to the eastern Mediterranean shore. Institute of Nautical Archaeology describes the ship as "a small two-masted vessel with lateen sails. The mainmast was stepped slightly aft of amidships, and the foremast, with a somewhat smaller sail, had probably raked forward over the bow. The ship had an overall length of perhaps only 50 Byzantine feet (15 m) and a breadth of 17 Byzantine feet (5.3 m)."

Nearly 20% of the hull survived, much in "fragmentary condition".

Cargo
The ship carried various goods, its cargo and wreck described as
3 metric tons of cullet (including a ton of broken Islamic vessels), some eighty pieces of intact glassware, nearly four dozen glazed Islamic bowls, approximately four dozen red-ware cooking vessels, half a dozen copper cauldrons and buckets, and sumac and raisins from a port within the Fatimid caliphate. ... Its iron shank snapped, perhaps from a sudden gust of the wind that is still funneled unexpectedly, but with gale force, down through the surrounding valleys. Suddenly adrift, the ship crashed onto the nearby rocky shore and sank.

The shipwreck is often called the Glass Shipwreck because of many glass pieces found on the site.  The glassware found was used as a ballast; glass culled weighted two tons and "broken glassware and glass-making waste from some Islamic glass factory on the Fatimid Syrian coast" weighted one ton. The number of pieces was estimated as "between half a million and a million shards of broken glassware recovered from the wreck belonging to between 10,000 and 20,000 vessels".

Ceramics found at the site was analyzed and is thought to be from Beirut.

Hellenistic shipwreck
In 1973, another shipwreck was found in the bay. It was a merchant ship, during the excavations of 1978-1980 dozens of amphoras were found, with "grape seeds and resinous linings in many of them [that] indicate a cargo of wine". As noted by Pulak, Townsend, Koehler, and Wallace:
The amphoras and their stamps suggest that the ship sank ca. 280–275 B.C., providing a date for presumably contemporaneous glazed and plain wares found in the only area of the site excavated to the level of the ship's lead-sheathed hull. Other finds include millstones, marble and lead rings, a wooden toggle, and a length of lead pipe that may provide the earliest evidence for bilge pumps. The excavation was not continued after it was discovered that the wreck runs under a rockslide of massive boulders that might endanger the site if moved.

References

Sources

External links
Serçe Limani Shipwreck Glass
Designing the 11th‐century‐AD vessel from Serçe Limanı, Turkey

Ancient shipwrecks
Shipwrecks in the Mediterranean Sea
Ships preserved in museums
Archaeological discoveries in Turkey
Shipwrecks of Turkey